Tristán Falfán (born 8 October 1939) is an Argentine boxer. He competed in the men's featherweight event at the 1956 Summer Olympics.

References

External links
 

1939 births
Living people
Argentine male boxers
Olympic boxers of Argentina
Boxers at the 1956 Summer Olympics
Sportspeople from Córdoba, Argentina
Featherweight boxers